Dharsha Gupta is an Indian film actress who predominately appears in the Tamil entertainment industry. She is best known for her roles in TV shows telecasted on Star Vijay channel the comedy reality TV show Cooku with Comali (season 2) where she rose to fame.  Her movies were Rudra thandavam, Oh My Ghost, Medical Miracle 

Gupta made her debut film with Tamil film Rudra Thandavam (2021) under the direction of director Mohan G. Kshatriyan opposing actor Richard Rishi. In 2022 Gupta appeared in the bilingual film OMG - OH MY GHOST! starring actress Sunny Leone which also marks Dharsha's first  bilingual film.

Early life
Dharsha Gupta was born in Udumalaipettai, Tamil Nadu, India. She studied Computer Science Engineering in Dr. Mahalingam Engineering College, Pollachi. Her father was a development officer in LIC and Mother house wife. Dharsha made her debut movies in kannada but her early attempts weren't successful. She then got her breakthrough through Rudhrathandavam in 2021 as she developed interest in acting. Basically from a Malayali family settled in TamilNadu, she has her roots from Kochi. She also speaks  Tamil.

Career
She made her acting debut in the Tamil television serial Mullum Malarum which aired on Zee Tamil. She also played an key important role in Senthoora Poove on Star Vijay along with Ranjith,  In 2020, She appeared in the comedy reality show called Cooku with Comali (season 2) where she bagged limelight and turned out very successfully after her appearance. In the year 2021, director Mohan G. Kshatriyan approached Dharsha offering her a massive female lead role in his action thriller film film Rudra Thandavam which was under his direction, she later agreed to the offer and acted in the film playing the character Varahi which also marked her first debut film as a lead actress. She later signed up another massive film titled as Medical Miracle playing the lead female tole once again, she is opposing actor and comedian Yogi Babu in the film. In 2021, she won Best Debutante Actress Of The Year in the FAB AWARD film festival. Director Abhishek Kapoor approached Dharsha offering her a supporting role in his upcoming Tamil film OMG - OH MY GHOST starring actress Sunny Leone who played the lead.

During the COVID-19 lock-down in India. Dharsha helped more than 20000 people by offering them a shelter and basic medical needs. She also won the award of Heart of the year after the service to the community.

Filmography

Television

Films

Awards and nominations

References

External links
 Dharsha Gupta on Instagram
 

Living people
Indian television actresses
Actresses in Tamil cinema
Indian film actresses
Actresses from Chennai
21st-century Indian actresses
Year of birth missing (living people)